Bhumij may refer to:

Bhumij people, tribal ethnic group of India
Bhumij language, the language of Bhumij people
Bhumija, type of Shikhara